Alina Forsman (1845–1899) was a Finnish sculptor. She is referred to as the first female sculptor in Finland.

Life 
Alina Forsman reportedly had a "burning interest" for the art of sculpture, which was controversial for a woman at the time, as sculpturing, demanding physical labor, was regarded as a masculine subject. 

She debuted as a sculptor in 1871. She studied art in Germany and Rome in 1873–75 and in Copenhagen in 1875–78. 

She can be regarded as the first female Finnish sculptor rather than Eveliina Särkelä (1847–1939), active just shortly after her, who is normally referred to a such; however, Forsman mainly worked abroad rather than in her native Finland. 

From 1887 onward, she lived permanently in Germany; first in Berlin, and later in Weimar.

References

 kansallisbiografia Suomen kansallisbiografia  (National Biography of Finland)

1845 births
1899 deaths
19th-century Finnish sculptors
Finnish women sculptors
19th-century Finnish women artists